The Sydney Accord is an international mutual recognition agreement for qualifications in the fields of engineering technology.

Definition and background
The Sydney Accord is an agreement between the bodies responsible for accrediting engineering technologist qualification programs in each of the signatory countries. 
It recognizes the substantial equivalency of programs accredited by those bodies, and recommends that graduates of accredited programs in any of the signatory countries be recognized by the other countries as having met the academic requirements for entry to the practice of engineering technologist. The Sydney Accord was signed in 2001.

Scope
The Sydney Accord covers engineering technologist qualifications.

The scope of the Sydney Accord only covers the academic requirement for an engineering technologist qualification.  Engineering technologist titles do not transfer directly between signatory countries that don't have reciprocating agreements, because the signatory countries reserve the right to scrutinize foreign titles and compare them to their own licensing criteria. However, this does not mean the titles are not respected by employers within those signatory countries.

The engineering technologist may be hired within a country by an employer where a formal license is not required. The industrial exemption clause negates formal engineering registration within the United States for those who meet the criteria.

Foreign titles may be utilized as a foundation for recognition of professional licensing.  The titles can be supplemented with additional experience and/or training to meet the local definition of formal registration.  This serves to underline that a foreign technologist covered under the accord does not arrive in a fellow signatory country without merit.  The Sydney Accord is therefore not a hollow agreement without advantages.

Accord Enhancements
The Canadian Council of Technicians and Technologists (CCTT) and the United Kingdom's Institution of Incorporated Engineers (IIE) signed a reciprocating agreement of recognition for engineering technologist. In 2006, the IIE merged with the Institute of Electrical Engineers (IEE) to form the Institution of Engineering and Technology (IET). The CCTT also signed a reciprocating agreement with the National Institute for Certification in Engineering Technologies (NICET).  NICET is a United States organization sponsored by the National Society of Professional Engineers (NSPE).  The formal recognition of the CCTT as a common link between NICET and the IET has not been realized.

Signatories 
The signatory countries/territories of the Sydney Accord are: 
 Australia - (Engineers Australia, 2001)
 Canada - (Canadian Council of Technicians and Technologists, 2001)
 Taiwan - (Institute of Engineering Education Taiwan, 2014)
 Hong Kong - (The Hong Kong Institution of Engineers, 2001)
 Ireland - (Engineers Ireland, 2001)
 Korea - (Accreditation Board for Engineering Education of Korea, 2013)
 Malaysia - (Board of Engineers Malaysia, 2018)
 New Zealand - (Institution of Professional Engineers New Zealand, 2001)
 South Africa - (Engineering Council of South Africa, 2001)
 United Kingdom - (Engineering Council UK, 2001)
 United States - (ABET, 2009)
 Sri Lanka - (The Institution of Engineers Sri Lanka)

Canada
Canada has signed the Sydney Accord with the title of "Applied Science" and "Engineering Technologist".

The Canadian signatory body is the Canadian Council of Technicians and Technologists (CCTT).   This is different from the Canadian signatory of the Washington Accord, Engineers Canada.

In the case of all other Sydney Accord members, the same organization has signed both the Sydney Accord and the Washington Accord.

Hong Kong
Hong Kong originally signed the Sydney Accord with the title of "Science Technologist" and later abbreviated the title to "Technologist."

United States
The United States applied for recognition with the Sydney Accord in 2007 and was granted that status in 2009. Despite this achievement the United States still has significant confusion in defining a unified technologist registration for professionals. Part of the reason for this is that the engineering technology profession is not well defined as a separate profession (distinct from professional engineering) in the United States. This is because the NSPE has opposed legal registration of technologist by the United States government through a licensing program. The loss of government oversight has led to competing ideologies from societies with different perspectives on what represents the qualities of a technologist.

Confusion
Some legitimate societies and organizations that have established technology programs do not have clear representation in the accord. The Society of Manufacturing Engineers (SME), and the Society of Broadcast Engineers (SBE) are two organizations that have engineering technology and technician certifications that are respected and recognized but operate independently from the accord.  In addition to these societies there are legitimate accreditations that are unacknowledged.  They are the Distance Education and Training Council (DETC), the National Association of Industrial Technology (NAIT), the Accrediting Commission of Career Schools and Colleges of Technology (ACCSCT), or other non-ABET/TAC institutions that are exclusively regionally accredited.  It is unclear if these organizations or societies will eventually be represented by a formal avenue of recognition in the Sydney Accord.

Registrations
As an international representative of the accord the UK offer a registration program for individuals from any country.  However, since the standards for technologist are higher in UK (B.Sc. and B.Eng. in Engineering) only 25 UK (emigrating) registrants up to this date applied for registration as "Technologist" indicating the failure of the Accord within UK.  In the UK the term "engineer", "professional engineer" or "engineering" have no meaning in law so anyone can call themselves a professional engineer, or technologist without restrictions. However the titles "Chartered Engineer", "Incorporated Engineer" and "Engineering Technician" awarded by The Engineering Council (UK) are protected by law. United States' graduates may apply for a peer review by the Engineering Council UK if they belong to one of the organizations or societies that are not explicitly mentioned as a member of the accord.  Individuals that graduate from a regionally accredited technology program are likely to receive acceptance through professional engineering registration as an Incorporated Engineer.

U.S. professional registration is a state concern. While the profession of engineering technologist is not specifically recognised, many states provide engineering technologists with a pathway towards Professional Engineer (PE) licensing that bypasses national engineering requirements. This is opposed by the national regulatory and representative bodies for professional engineers, the National Society of Professional Engineers (NSPE). Notably, the Washington Accord does not apply to American PEs who have obtained this status through a technologist route.

See also
 Dublin Accord - engineering technicians
 Seoul Accord - computing and information technology
 Certified Engineering Technologist

References

External links
 International Engineering Alliance Sydney Accord website

Engineering education
Professional titles and certifications